Euthelaira is a genus of parasitic flies in the family Tachinidae. There are at least two described species in Euthelaira.

Species
These two species belong to the genus Euthelaira:
 Euthelaira inambarica Townsend, 1912
 Euthelaira rufilabris (Wulp, 1890)

References

Further reading

 
 
 
 

Tachinidae
Articles created by Qbugbot